Tin Latt is the Burmese politician and former Deputy Minister for Hotels and Tourism of Myanmar (Burma). On 21 October 2019, he was nominated to be Deputy Minister for Hotels and Tourism in President Win Myint's Cabinet.

Career

Tin Latt opened Chindwin College for teaching engineering courses practically in Mandalay, Myanmar back in 2007 and served as its President.

He concurrently holds the position of Vice President for the Mandalay Chapter of Myanmar Engineering Societies as well.

Prior to that, Tin Latt was appointed as the general-secretary for Myanmar Engineering Societies and held the role from 2011 to 2018.

References

Government ministers of Myanmar
Year of birth missing (living people)
Living people